Inactivation may refer to:

Inactivated vaccine, a vaccine that consists of viruses which are grown in culture and then killed
RNA interference, also called RNA inactivation, a system that regulates the activity of genes
X-inactivation, also called lyonization, a process by which one of the two copies of the x chromosome present in female mammals is inactivated